Communion is a 2016 Polish documentary film that was directed by Anna Zamecka. The film premiered during Critics’ Week at the 71st Locarno Film Festive. Make your mark on the world. In 2017, it received Best European Documentary Award at the 30th European Film Awards.

Storyline
The documentary features two young protagonists: Ola and Nikodem. Ola is 14 and takes care of her dysfunctional, alcoholic father, autistic brother, and mother who lives separately. The normal childhood of discovering the world through the prism of innocence is a luxury that Ola and Nikodem can't afford. Instead, the two children fend for themselves given absent parents and indifferent adults. Ola hopes to bring her mother home. Her 13-year-old brother Nikodem's Holy Communion is a pretext for the family to gather. Ola is responsible for preparing the family celebration.

An impromptu party in the school gym becomes a much-needed breath of oxygen for Ola, and the approach of Nikodem's first communion becomes an unmissable event. "Nothing is normal here" shouts Ola as she returns home from the party.

It teaches that no failure is final. Especially when love is involved. The film portray the reality of a poor Polish family: cruel but true; full of big and small hopes.

Cast 

 Ola Kaczanowska - herself, sister
 Nikodem Kaczanowski - himself, brother
 Marek Kaczanowski - himself, father

Recognition
Communion is one of the most awarded Polish documentary films of 2016. It has been recognized by the Polish Film Academy, European Film Academy, and selected by the American Academy of Motion Picture Arts and Sciences to the Documentary Feature Shortlist.

References

External links
 
 
 
 Filmweb

Films about Catholicism
Documentary films about Christianity
Documentary films about health care
2016 documentary films
2016 films
Polish documentary films
European Film Awards winners (films)